Timaukel is a commune located in the Chilean part of Tierra del Fuego Island. It is part of Tierra del Fuego Province in Magallanes Region. The commune is administered by the municipality in Villa Cameron, which is the main port and settlement within the commune.

Demographics
The population grew by 68% (171 persons) between the 1992 and 2002 censuses.

It is a distinctly rural commune, almost deserted, most of the population is of English origin, who live on farms and is devoted to agriculture, there are also some sawmills. In recent years tourism has become important.

Administration
As a commune, Timaukel is a third-level administrative division of Chile administered by a municipal council, headed by an alcalde who is directly elected every four years. The 2012–2016 alcalde is Alfonso Simunovic Ojeda.

Within the electoral divisions of Chile, Timaukel is represented in the Chamber of Deputies by Juan Morano (PDC) and Gabriel Boric (Ind.) as part of the 60th electoral district, which includes the entire Magallanes y la Antártica Chilena Region. The commune is represented in the Senate by Carlos Bianchi Chelech (Ind.) and Carolina Goic (PDC) as part of the 19th senatorial constituency (Magallanes y la Antártica Chilena Region).

References

External links
  Municipality of Timaukel

Communes of Chile
Populated places in Magallanes Region
Populated places in Tierra del Fuego Province, Chile